Collinsville Cemetery is a historic cemetery located near West Turin in Lewis County, New York.  It was established in 1810.  It remains an active burial ground containing approximately 380 marked burials.  It is the final resting place of many early settlers of the region.  A number of the markers include verse epitaphs.

It was listed on the National Register of Historic Places in 2014.

References

External links
 

Cemeteries on the National Register of Historic Places in New York (state)
1810 establishments in New York (state)
Buildings and structures in Lewis County, New York
National Register of Historic Places in Lewis County, New York